Jeremy Koling is a professional disc golfer from Charlotte, North Carolina. He competes on the sport's North American tour: the Disc Golf Pro Tour, and competed on the PDGA National Tour until its last season in 2021. Among his most notable accomplishments are his 2008 PDGA Amateur World Championship win and his 2016 United States Disc Golf Championship win. Koling is the only male player to win the PDGA Amateur World Championships and earn the PDGA Male Rookie of the Year Award in back-to-back years (2008 and 2009).

Professional career 

Koling has 68 professional wins. As a professional, he has won two National Tour events and one Major, the 2016 USDGC. He finished 4th in the 2016 NT, and 16th in the inaugural DGPT points standings. He has won two Pro World Mixed Doubles Championships with partner Paige Pierce.

Notable wins

Summary

*Through January 2017

Annual statistics

†At Year End

Equipment

Koling is currently sponsored by Innova Champion Discs. He commonly carries the following discs: 

Drivers
Champion Shryke
Star Destroyer
C-Line FD (Discmania)
Champion Firebird
Champion Eagle
C-Line PD2 (Discmania)
Champion Roadrunner 
Champion Thunderbird
Star Thunderbird
Star Wraith
Pro Boss

Midranges
Frontline X Mortar (Hyzer Bomb)
C-Line MD2 (Discmania)
C-Line MD3 (Discmania)
Star Roc

Putters
XT Nova
P-Line P2 (Discmania)
AviarX3

References

American disc golfers
Living people
1985 births